Abidinpaşa is a town in Mamak District, in southeastern Ankara Province, Turkey.

The town takes its name from a pasha by the name of Abidin. He was assigned an Ottoman administrator in Ankara around the mid-1800s. He used to like fresh air, therefore he had his mansion (governor building) built in modern Abidinpaşa, which is a place on top of the one of the highest hills in Ankara. The area, where the mansion is, is a public park and the mansion serves as an historical place to tourists today.
  
One of the largest hospitals in Ankara Province, the Ankara University Hospital, is located in the town.

Towns in Turkey
Populated places in Ankara Province